Chimarocephala is a genus of band-winged grasshoppers in the family Acrididae. There are at least three described species in Chimarocephala.

Species
These three species belong to the genus Chimarocephala:
 Chimarocephala californica (Bruner, L., 1905) (California clouded grasshopper)
 Chimarocephala elongata Rentz, 1977
 Chimarocephala pacifica (Thomas, 1873) (painted meadow grasshopper)

References

Further reading

 
 

Oedipodinae
Articles created by Qbugbot